In chemistry, an arsenite is a chemical compound containing an arsenic oxyanion where arsenic has oxidation state +3. Note that in fields that commonly deal with groundwater chemistry, arsenite is used generically to identify soluble AsIII anions. IUPAC have recommended that arsenite compounds are to be named as arsenate(III), for example ortho-arsenite is called trioxidoarsenate(III).
Ortho-arsenite contrasts to the corresponding anions of the lighter members of group 15, phosphite which has the structure  and nitrite,  which is bent.

A number of different arsenite anions are known:
 ortho-arsenite, an ion of arsenous acid, with a pyramidal shape
 meta-arsenite, a polymeric chain anion.
 pyro-arsenite, 
 a polyarsenite, 
 a polyarsenite, 
, a polymeric anion

In all of these the geometry around the AsIII centers are approximately trigonal, the lone pair on the arsenic atom is stereochemically active.
Well known examples of arsenites include sodium meta-arsenite which contains a polymeric linear anion, and silver ortho-arsenite, which contains the trigonal  anion.

Preparation of arsenites

Arsenite minerals
A number of minerals contain arsenite anions: reinerite, ; finnemanite, ; paulmooreite, ; stenhuggarite,  (contains a complex polymeric anion); schneiderhöhnite, FeFe; magnussonite, ; trippkeite, ; trigonite, ; tooeleite, .

Arsenites in the environment
Arsenic can enter groundwater due to naturally occurring arsenic at deeper levels or from mine workings. Arsenic(III) can be removed from water by a number of methods, oxidation of AsIII to AsV for example with chlorine followed by coagulation with for example iron(III) sulfate. Other methods include ion-exchange and filtration. Filtration is only effective if arsenic is present as particulates, if the arsenite is in solution it passes through the filtration membrane.

Uses
Sodium arsenite is used in the water gas shift reaction to remove carbon dioxide.

Bacteria using and generating arsenite
Some species of bacteria obtain their energy by oxidizing various fuels while reducing arsenates to form arsenites. The enzymes involved are known as arsenate reductases.

In 2008, bacteria were discovered that employ a version of photosynthesis with arsenites as electron donors, producing arsenates (just like ordinary photosynthesis uses water as electron donor, producing molecular oxygen). The researchers conjectured that historically these photosynthesizing organisms produced the arsenates that allowed the arsenate-reducing bacteria to thrive.

In humans, arsenite inhibits pyruvate dehydrogenase (PDH complex) in the pyruvate-acetyl CoA reaction, by binding to the –SH group of lipoamide, a participant coenzyme. It also inhibits the oxoglutarate dehydrogenase complex by the same mechanism. The inhibition of these enzymes disrupts energy production.

References

External links
Case Studies in Environmental Medicine - Arsenic Toxicity
Page at chemicalland21.com

Oxyanions

Arsenic(III) compounds